Leposoma nanodactylus is a species of lizard in the family Gymnophthalmidae. It is endemic to Brazil.

References

Leposoma
Reptiles of Brazil
Endemic fauna of Brazil
Reptiles described in 1997
Taxa named by Miguel Trefaut Rodrigues